National High School (or NHS) is a government-aided high school in the Basavanagudi section of Bangalore, India. 

With grades/classes for 8th, 9th and 10th, NHS caters to academically eligible students regardless of religion or caste.  NHS is run by the National Education Society (NES).

History
In 1917 Dr. Annie Besant and several others founded NHS in Bangalore.  During its early years, NHS hosting several activists for Indian independence from Great Britain. Mahatma Gandhi visited NHS on several occasions. 

It is said that on one of Gandhiji's visits, he had said "If on a map of India the places I love are marked red, the place on which the National High School stands will be marked very very red". Past students of the school recall this as having been told to them by some of their teachers.

In its glory days - from inception till around mid to end 1980s, National High School attracted the best students, had an outstanding overall academic record. In the annual Class 10 State Board exams, National High School would have at least 5 places in the Top 10 ranks for many successive years. In extra curricular activities too, the school produced some outstanding sportsmen of national and international repute.

Admission
Admission is open to all qualifying students without regard to religion, caste or creed. NHS requires an overall score of 85%–90% in the seventh standard exam for admission

Panchayat elections
There are five sections for each grade/class, A to E. For each section there are five leaders elected, normally three boys and two girls. Among all the 25 leaders, There will be another round of election for the selection of school Union Leader and two other Members of Union Cabinet who represent the school. This election process is annually conducted in the month of July.

Facilities

Labs
 Physics Lab
 Biology Lab
 Chemistry Lab
 Science Centre 
 Computer Lab

Sport
 Cricket
 Handball
 Hockey 
 Football
 Badminton
 Swimming
 Athletics
 Table tennis
 Tennis
 Carrom
 Chess
 Basketball

Other Facilities
 Smart Boards
 Library 
 NCC
 Seva Dala
 Afternoon Meals ( ಬಿಸಿ ಊಟ )

"Clubs"
 Science club
 Eco club
 Consumer club
 Rotary interaction club
 Surakshana samiti

Faculty
 Dr. Venkatarama Bhattar – Sanskrit (Pratibha Bhushana awardee)(Head Master)
This list will be updated to the extent possible soon.

Challenges Ahead
The institution was highly reputed for a long time - since inception and till mid 1990s. A huge influx of private schools since late 1980s drastically changed the education scenario in Karnataka as well as rest of India, which led to a steady decline in the sheen on National High School.

Several attempts have been made by distinguished alumni to restore the glory of National High School, An attempt by Anil Kumble (along with Dr CNR Rao who studied in National College) was made with hope of adequate funding to modernize the institution. However, the attempt did not materialize. 

Most recently, a technology organization owned by a alumni stepped in to set up a Robotics and Artificial Intelligence Lab at the school. This seems to be shaping up well

Alumni

Notable alumni
 H.D. Kumaraswamy – Chief Minister of Karnataka.
 Anil Kumble - Cricketer
 Ramesh Aravind - Film actor
 Chandrashekar - Film Actor
 Dr Vishnuvardhan - Film Actor
 Raghunath. N – Deputy Manager, Bharat Electronics Limited, Ministry of Defence, Government of India
 Vinayak Joshi - Film Actor
 Arjun Sarja - Famous Movie Actor
 Sunil Rao - Film Actor
 Srujan Lokesh - Stand up Comedian
 EAS Prasanna - Cricketer
 Bhagwat Chandrashekar - Cricketer
 Prakash Podukone - Ex Badmintion Player
 Dr T. S. Nagabharna - Chairman of Kannada Development Authority of Govt of Karnataka.
Manharlal Pranlal Thakkar - Justice of the Supreme Court of India
Dr. G. Guruswamy Principal Scientist, NASA

See also
 National College, Bangalore

References

External links
 udyam.org

1917 establishments in India
Educational institutions established in 1917
High schools and secondary schools in Bangalore